Polysplenia is a congenital disease manifested by multiple small accessory spleens, rather than a single, full-sized, normal spleen.  Polysplenia sometimes occurs alone, but it is often accompanied by other developmental abnormalities.  Conditions associated with polysplenia include gastrointestinal abnormalities, such as intestinal malrotation or biliary atresia, as well as cardiac abnormalities, such as dextrocardia.

Associated conditions
There are frequent associated congenital anomalies all related to deviations in the development of anatomical asymmetries in early embryonic stages. These conditions considered together are called "polysplenia syndrome".

Associated conditions include heterotaxy syndrome, intestinal malrotation, situs inversus, biliary atresia, and several cardiac malformations.  Associated cardiac conditions include dextrocardia, atrial situs ambiguus, ventricular inversion, and VA concordance with left posterior aorta.

Although present, the multiple small spleens are often ineffective; this is termed functional asplenia.

References

External links 

Diseases of spleen